Enrico Giusti (born Priverno, 1940), is an Italian mathematician mainly known for his contributions to the fields of calculus of variations, regularity theory of partial differential equations, minimal surfaces and history of mathematics. He has been professor of mathematics at the Università di Firenze; he also taught and conducted research at the Australian National University at Canberra, at the Stanford University and at the University of California, Berkeley. After retirement, he devoted himself to the managing of the "Giardino di Archimede", a museum entirely dedicated to mathematics and its applications. Giusti is also the editor-in-chief of the international journal, dedicated to the history of mathematics "Bollettino di storia delle scienze matematiche".

One of the most famous results of Giusti, is the one obtained with Enrico Bombieri and Ennio De Giorgi, concerning the minimality of Simons' cones, and allowing to disprove the validity of Bernstein's theorem in dimension larger than 8. The work on minimal surfaces was mentioned in the citation of the Fields medal eventually awarded to Bombieri in 1974.

Giusti has a sustained interest in the history of mathematics, e.g. the mathematics of Pierre de Fermat (see Giusti 2009). He is the currently the director of the Garden of Archimedes, a museum devoted to mathematics in Florence, Italy.

Awards
Giusti won the Caccioppoli Prize of the Italian Mathematical Union in 1978 and in 2003 was awarded with the national medal for mathematics by the Accademia Nazionale delle Scienze (dei XL).

Selected publications
"Minimal cones and the Bernstein problem" (with E. Bombieri e E. De Giorgi), Inventiones Mathematicae 7 (1969) 243–268
"Harnack's inequality for elliptic differential equations on minimal surfaces" (with E. Bombieri), Inventiones Mathematicae 15 (1972), 24–46

.
"On the equation of surfaces of prescribed mean curvature. Existence and uniqueness without boundary conditions", Inventiones Mathematicae 46 (1978), 111–137
"On the regularity of the minima of variational integrals" (with M. Giaquinta), Acta Mathematica 148 (1982), 31–46
"Differentiability of minima of nondifferentiable functionals" (with M. Giaquinta), Inventiones Mathematicae 72 (1983), 285–298
"The singular set of the minima of certain quadratic functionals" (with M. Giaquinta), Annali della Scuola Normale Superiore di Pisa Classe di Scienze (Serie 4) 11 (1984), 45–55.
Giusti, Enrico, Les méthodes des maxima et minima de Fermat. Ann. Fac. Sci. Toulouse Math. (6) 18 (2009), Fascicule Spécial, 59–85.

See also
Hilbert's nineteenth problem
Plateau's problem

References

External links
 Site of Caccioppoli Prize 

21st-century Italian mathematicians
Living people
1940 births
PDE theorists
Variational analysts
Academic staff of the University of Pisa